Jean-Antoine du Cerceau (12 November 1670 – 4 July 1730) was a French Jesuit priest, poet, playwright and man of letters.

Du Cerceau taught at several Jesuit colleges, where he composed several plays for the benefit of his students, who performed them on the college grounds. His work became popular, with performances being held at court, and Du Cerceau was made private tutor go the prince of Conti. In 1730 du Cerceau was accidentally shot and killed by his pupil. He was the most popular Jesuit dramatist, and his plays would be republished many times for more than a century after his death.

Major works 
Carmina, Poem in Latin, 1705
Les Incommodités de la grandeur, Heroic Drama, 1713
Opera. Nova editio, aucta et emendat, 1724
Histoire de la dernière révolution de Perse, 1728
Conjuration de Nicolas Gabrini, dit de Rienzi, tyran de Rome en 1347, completed by Pierre Brumoy, 1733
Histoire de Thamas Kouli-Kan, Sophi de Perse, 1740–1741
Réflexions sur la poésie françoise : où l'on fait voir en quoi consiste la beauté des vers, et où l'on donne des règles sûres pour réussir à les bien faire ; avec une défense de la poësie, et une apologie pour les sçavans, 1742
Théâtre du P. Du Cerceau à l'usage des collèges, New expanded edition of his life and works, 1822 Texte en ligne
Œuvres de Du Cerceau, contenant son théâtre et ses poésies, new edition with notes, and a preliminary essay on the author, 1828 Text online 1 2

External links 
 Jean-Antoine du Cerceau on Data.bnf.fr

1670 births
1730 deaths
French Jesuits
18th-century Latin-language writers
Writers from Paris
New Latin-language poets
18th-century French poets
18th-century French male writers
18th-century French dramatists and playwrights